Medlar bodies, also known as sclerotic or muriform cells, are thick walled cells (5-12 microns) with multiple internal transverse septa or chambers that resemble copper pennies.  When present in skin or subcutaneous tissue, the cells are indicative of chromoblastomycosis.

References

Mycology